Glenea dimorpha is a species of beetle in the family Cerambycidae. It was described by Vives in 2005. It is found in Vietnam.

References

dimorpha
Beetles described in 2005